Arodes may refer to:

 Kato Arodes, a village in Cyprus
 Pano Arodes, a village in Cyprus